The 29th Attack Squadron is a remotely piloted vehicle training unit of the United States Air Force. Assigned to the 49th Operations Group, 49th Wing at Holloman Air Force Base, New Mexico. Flying the General Atomics MQ-9 Reaper. It was activated on 23 October 2009.

Overview
The 29th Attack Squadron MQ-9 Reaper remotely piloted aircraft (RPA) mission is to provide close air support (CAS), air interdiction, intelligence, surveillance and reconnaissance (ISR), and attack to eliminate threats when present. The multi-role capabilities of these RPAs allows combat search and rescue operations and extended time over targets to locate, track, target, strike, and assess time-sensitive targets

History

World War II
Constituted as 13 Observation Squadron (Medium) on 5 February 1942. Activated on 10 Mar 1942 at Brooks Field, Texas, with O-52 observation aircraft and L-4 in the period 1942 to 1943. Redesignated as: 13 Observation Squadron on 4 July 1942; 13 Reconnaissance Squadron (Fighter) on 1 April 1943; 13 Tactical Reconnaissance Squadron on 11 August 1943. Operating P-39, 1943-1944 and P-40 1944-1945. Redesignated 29 Reconnaissance Squadron (Night Photographic) on 25 January 1946. Inactivated on 29 July 1946.

Cold War tactical reconnaissance
Redesignated as 29 Tactical Reconnaissance Squadron (Photo-Jet) on 14 January 1954. Under Tactical Air Command and equipped with RF-80A Shooting Stars at Shaw AFB, South Carolina. Performed training of reconnaissance pilots; being upgraded to the Republic RF-84F Thunderflash in 1955 and the McDonnell RF-101C Voodoo in 1957 as a component of the 432d Tactical Reconnaissance Group. Remained at Shaw when the 432d was inactivated and reassigned to the 363d Tactical Reconnaissance Wing. Redesignated as 29 Tactical Reconnaissance Squadron on 1 October 1966. 

Equipped with the McDonnell RF-4C Phantom II due to a critical need for reconnaissance pilots due to the Vietnam War. Performed training on the RF-4C until  24 January 1971 when inactivated due to the USAF drawdown in Vietnam and budget reductions.

Remotely piloted vehicle operations
On 23 October 2009, the 29th Attack Squadron stood up under the 49th Wing at Holloman Air Force Base, New Mexico under the command of Lt Colonel James S. Merchant.  An initial cadre of twelve instructors (six instructor pilots and six instructor sensor operators) manned the unit.  The unit replaced the 432d Operations Group, Detachment 3. It is a General Atomics MQ-9 Reaper Formal Training Unit.

Lineage
 Constituted as the 13th Observation Squadron (Medium) on 5 February 1942
 Activated on 10 March 1942
 Redesignated 13th Observation Squadron on 4 July 1942
 Redesignated 13th Reconnaissance Squadron (Fighter) on 1 April 1943
 Redesignated 13th Tactical Reconnaissance Squadron on 11 August 1943
 Redesignated 29th Reconnaissance Squadron (Night Photographic) on 25 January 1946
 Inactivated on 29 July 1946
 Redesignated 29th Tactical Reconnaissance Squadron (Photographic-Jet) on 14 January 1954
 Activated on 18 March 1954
 Redesignated 29th Tactical Reconnaissance Squadron and activated on 1 October 1966
 Inactivated 24 January 1971
 Redesignated 29th Attack Squadron on 20 October 2009
 Activated on 23 October 2009

Assignments
 74th Observation Group (later 74th Reconnaissance Group, 74th Tactical Reconnaissance Group), 2 March 1942
 XIX Tactical Air Command, 7 November 1945 (attached to 69th Reconnaissance Group)
 69th Reconnaissance Group, 25 January–29 July 1946
 432d Tactical Reconnaissance Group, 18 March 1954
 432d Tactical Reconnaissance Wing, 8 February 1958 (attached to 363d Tactical Reconnaissance Wing after 8 April 1959)
 363d Tactical Reconnaissance Wing, 18 May 1959
 4403d Tactical Training Group, 1 July 1966
 363d Tactical Reconnaissance Wing, 20 January 1968 – 24 January 1971
 49th Operations Group, 23 October 2009 – present

Stations

 Brooks Field, Texas, 2 March 1942
 Lawson Field, Georgia, c. 8 March 1942;
 DeRidder Army Air Base, Louisiana, 11 April 1942
 Esler Field, Louisiana, 15 December 1942
 Desert Center Army Air Field, California, 28 December 1942
 Morris Field, North Carolina, 24 September 1943
 Camp Campbell Army Airfield, Kentucky, 5 November 1943

 DeRidder Army Air Base, Louisiana, 19 April 1944
 Stuttgart Army Air Field, Arkansas, 7 February 1945
 Brooks Field, Texas, 8 December 1945 – 29 July 1946
 Shaw Air Force Base, South Carolina, 18 March 1954 – 24 January 1971
 Holloman Air Force Base, New Mexico, 23 October 2009 – present

Aircraft
 Curtiss O-52 Owl, 1942–1943
 Piper L-4 Cub, 1942–1943;
 Bell P-39 Airacobra, 1943–1944
 Curtiss P-40F Warhawk, 1944–1945
 North American P-51 Mustang, 1945–1946
 North American F-6 Mustang, 1945–1946
 Douglas A-26 Invader, 1946
 Lockheed RF-80A Shooting Star, 1955
 Republic RF-84F Thunderflash, 1955–1958
 McDonnell RF-101C Voodoo, 1957–1971
 McDonnell RF-4C Phantom II, 1968–1971
 General Atomics MQ-9 Reaper, 2009–present

References

 Notes

Bibliography

  (subscription required for web access)

External links
 
 The Official Home Page of the U.S. Air Force
 http://www.shephard.co.uk/news/4168/reaper-takes-flight-at-holloman/
  https://web.archive.org/web/20110927153214/http://www.holloman.af.mil/news/story.asp?id=123177365
 On Intellipedia

Attack squadrons of the United States Air Force